The 118th district of the Texas House of Representatives contains parts of central San Antonio. The current Representative is John Lujan, who was first elected in 2020.

References 

118